Discoveries in Australia; with an account of the coasts and rivers explored and surveyed during the voyage of H.M.S. Beagle, in the years 1837-38-39-40-41-42-43, by command of the Lords Commissioners of the Admiralty. Also a narrative of Captain Owen Stanley's visits to the islands in the Arafura Sea., widely known as Discoveries in Australia, is an 1846 two-volume work by John Lort Stokes. It comprises the edited journals of the explorations and surveys, both maritime and inland, of Stokes and other members of the crew of HMS Beagle, during a surveying expedition in Australia that lasted from 1837 to 1843. The work is of immense historical significance, as a great many places in Australia were discovered during the expedition, and the names and locations of these places were published for the first time in Discoveries in Australia.

In his Australian Rare Books 1788-1900, Jonathon Wantrup describes Discoveries in Australia in the following terms:

References

External links

1846 non-fiction books
Books about Australian exploration
Diaries
Exploration of Australia
Exploration of Western Australia